The Men's 2004 European Union Amateur Boxing Championships were held in Madrid, Spain from June 20 to June 27.

The 4th edition of the annual competition was organised by the European governing body for amateur boxing, EABA. A total number of 92 fighters from across Europe competed at these championships.

Medal winners

External links
EABA Boxing

References

Boxing Championships
European Union Amateur Boxing Championships
International boxing competitions hosted by Spain
Sports competitions in Madrid
European Union Amateur Boxing Championships
2004 in Madrid